Carsten Pohl (born 23 March 1965) is a German professional basketball coach. He served as head coach and assistant coach for the Telekom Baskets Bonn of the German Basketball League between 2012 and 2016.

Since 2015, he leads the club's young talents development program.

In December 2015, he got promoted to head coach of the Baskets Bonn. In 2016, he handed the position over to Silvano Poropat to return to his duties as youth coordinator.

References

External links
 German BBL Profile
 Eurobasket.com Profile

1965 births
Living people
German basketball coaches
Sportspeople from Bonn
Telekom Baskets Bonn coaches